125 (one hundred [and] twenty-five) is the natural number following 124 and preceding 126.

In mathematics

125 is the cube of 5.
It can be expressed as a sum of two squares in two different ways, 125 = 10² + 5² = 11² + 2².

125 and 126 form a Ruth-Aaron pair under the second definition in which repeated prime factors are counted as often as they occur.

Like many other powers of 5, it is a Friedman number in base 10 since 125 = 51 + 2.

125 is the center of a close triplet of perfect powers, (121 = 112, 125 = 53, 128 = 27). Excluding the trivial cases of 0 and 1, the only closer such triplet is (4,8,9) and the only other equally close is (25, 27, 32).

U.S. military
 Air National Guard 125th Special Tactics Squadron unit in Portland, Oregon
 US Air Force 125th Fighter Wing, Air National Guard unit at Jacksonville International Airport, Florida
 US Navy VAW-125 squadron at Naval Station Norfolk, Virginia
 US Navy VFA-125 strike fighter squadron at Naval Air Station Lemoore, California
 , a US Navy fleet oiler during World War II
 , a US Navy minesweeper
 Northrop YC-125 Raider utility transport plane

In transportation
 The Fiat 125 automobile
 Many motorcycle licenses and racing events limit engine capacity to 125cc. Examples of 125cc motorcycles include;
 The Honda XRM 125 motorcycle
 The Yamaha YZ125, for motocross
 The Harlem-125th Street (Metro-North) station serving Harlem, New York City
 The InterCity 125, sometimes referred to simply as "one two five", a British high-speed train
 New Jersey Transit bus route 125
 London Buses route 125 is a Transport for London contracted bus route in London
 125 is the number of many roads, including Mexican Federal Highway 125
 Pan Am Flight 125 from London’s Heathrow Airport to New York's John F. Kennedy International Airport which had pressurization problems on March 10, 1987
 The 125th Street Bridge crosses the Mississippi River in Minnesota
 STS-125, a Space Shuttle Atlantis mission, the final mission to service the Hubble Space Telescope, launched May 11, 2009 at 2:01 pm EDT landed May 24, 2009 at 11:39:05 am EDT
 125 (dinghy) - a class of sailing dingy popular in Australia.
 EMD F125 locomotive manufactured by Electro Motive Diesel.

In other fields
125 is also:
 The year AD 125 or 125 BC
 125 AH is a year in the Islamic calendar that corresponds to 742 – 743 CE
 125 Liberatrix is a Main belt asteroid
 The atomic number of the yet-to-be-discovered element unbipentium
 Sonnet 125 by William Shakespeare
 125th Street, Manhattan, New York City
 125th Street (New York City Subway), multiple subway stations
 CA-125, also known as CA125, is an abbreviation for cancer antigen 125
 125 High Street is a 30-floor high-rise in Boston

See also 
 125th (disambiguation)
 125th Anniversary of the Confederation of Canada Medal
 125th Street (disambiguation)
 List of highways numbered 125
 United Nations Security Council Resolution 125

References

Integers